The 1995 European Athletics Junior Championships was held in Nyíregyháza, Hungary on July 27–30.

Men's results

Women's results

Medal table

References
Results - GBR Athletics
Results - GBR Athletics

European Athletics U20 Championships
International athletics competitions hosted by Hungary
E
1995 in Hungarian sport
1995 in youth sport
Nyíregyháza